Whilton Locks is the name of a flight of seven locks on the Grand Union Canal near Daventry, in the county of Northamptonshire, England. They are also referred to as Buckby Lock Flight.

History
Shortly afterwards, it was extended further south to Blisworth, but there were serious problems with Blisworth Tunnel, which had failed in January 1796. William Jessop was the engineer and wanted to abandon the idea of a tunnel. He proposed to build 29 locks to get beyond Blisworth, but was persuaded to try a different alignment by three engineers who were brought in to advise. Low level headings were cut to drain the main workings of water, and the tunnel opened on 25 March 1805, the last part of the canal to be completed. The Grand Junction Canal became part of the Grand Union Canal in 1929, following amalgamation with the Regents Canal, the Warwick and Birmingham Canal and the Warwich and Napton Canal.

Below the bottom lock was a long level pound stretching to beyond Blisworth Tunnel. The locks were built wide enough to take two narrow boats side by side, in the hope that the canals beyond the northern terminus could be persuaded to widen their locks and that wide barges carrying 70 tons could be operated.

The locks at Buckby were all built with side ponds, to conserve water. These are maintained at an intermediate level between the upper and lower pound. When a lock is emptying, water from the top of the lock fills the side pond, and the rest is then discharged to the lower pound. When a lock is filling, the bottom of the lock is filled from the pond, and the rest is drawn from the upper pound. Typically, this system uses 40 per cent less water, but the ponds have been disused for a long time, and an electric pump is now used to pump water from the bottom of the flight to the top. The Grand Junction Canal experimented with side ponds from the early 1800s. The locks at Bourne End had several radial ponds, but use of the ponds was abandoned because it took too long to use the lock. Those at Buckby had two rectangular side ponds per lock, at different levels, and this design was eventually installed at most locks between Buckby and lock 45 at Bulbourne, the junction with the Wendover Arm.

Location
The locks are numbered from 7 at the top of the flight to 13 at the bottom. To the south of the flight is a long level pound, which stretches  to the Stoke Bruerne Canal Museum and the top of the Stoke Bruerne flight of seven locks. Towards the southern end of this section is Blisworth Tunnel and Gayton Junction, where the Northampton Branch turns off to join the River Nene at Northampton. Just below the junction, the railway line from London to Rugby crosses the canal and then runs parallel to it. The railway then crosses to the east bank, and the canal diverges to the west. Just before the final lock, the canal passes under Watling Street, once a Roman road and now part of the A5 road. The Leicester section of the Grand Union Canal then turns off at Norton Junction, and the canal continues on the level, passing through Braunston Tunnel to reach the top lock of the six that descend to Braunston,  from the top of the Whilton flight.

Whilton Marina is located close to the bottom lock. It was set up in 1971 in a field beside the canal, and now has 200 private moorings, while another 50 are occupied by boats which are for sale. The marina offers a full range of services. Between locks 7 and 8 there is an early nineteenth-century bridge, resting on stone supports. The piers and parapets are made of brick, and the structure is grade II listed.

See also

Bibliography

References

External links
 Geograph image 7788, Whilton Locks
 Geograph image 454982, Canal bridge, Whilton Locks
 Geograph image 455026, Wilton Locks water storage tanks
  – Top Lock  – Bottom Lock

Transport in Northamptonshire
Tourist attractions in Northamptonshire
Lock flights of England